The ANT-IV was one of three aerosans introduced in 1924.  This model, operated by a crew of two, doubled the ANT-III's  with its new Bristol engine, and outperformed the ANT-V's  Fiat engine.

In 1930 the ANT-IV began regular trips between Cheboksar and Kanash, carrying mail and priority passengers.  The following year the ANT-IVs were overhauled with Soviet-produced M-11 radial aviation engines, allowing them to travel at 28 km/h.

In 1934, an ANT-IV was delivered aboard the Smolensk to Ualen where it helped rescue remotely stranded explorers from the icebreaker Chelyuskin.

External links 
 ANT-IV Snowmobile at the Russian Battlefield

Snowmobile brands
World War II armoured fighting vehicles of the Soviet Union